The Runaway Bunny is a 1942 picture book written by Margaret Wise Brown and illustrated by Clement Hurd. The plot deals with a small rabbit, who wants to run away. His mother, however, tells him that "if you run away, I will run after you."

This book is the first in Brown and Hurd's "classic series," which also includes Goodnight Moon and My World.  The picture of a cow jumping over the moon, which features prominently in Goodnight Moon, first appeared in The Runaway Bunny. A copy of The Runaway Bunny appears in Goodnight Moon, as does the illustration of the mother fishing for the bunny child. The three books have been published together as a collection titled Over the Moon.

An animated special based on the book was released on HBO Max on March 25, 2021. The special is narrated by Tracee Ellis Ross.

Synopsis 
A little bunny tells his mother that he is going to run away, becoming variously a fish, a rock on a mountain, a crocus in a hidden garden, a bird, a sailboat, a circus acrobat, and finally a little boy, until he resigns himself to stay where he is and remain her little bunny. Mother Bunny appears as a fisherman, a mountain climber, a gardener, a tree, a cloud, a trapeze walker, and finally the mother herself.

The illustrations alternate between 2-page black-and-white line images and accompanying text, and 2-page painted spreads. Similar alternation of black-and-white spreads and color spreads occur in all three books in the series.

Publication history 
Brown claimed that her inspiration for The Runaway Bunny came from "Chanson de Magali," a love song based on French Provençal folklore. The call and response structure of Brown's text provides an emotionally compelling depiction of a small child's first burst of independence and a mother's affirmation of unconditional love.

The closing line of the book, "'Have a carrot,' said the mother bunny," was added after Ursula Nordstrom, the director of Harper's Department of Books for Boys and Girls, told Brown that the ending needed work. The line was cabled in to Harper's from Maine, where Brown was on vacation. There have been two different final illustrations for this book.

The book has been in print continuously since 1942.

In popular culture 

The Runaway Bunny has been adapted into a concerto for violin, reader and orchestra by the contemporary American composer Glen Roven, with text from the book.

The Runaway Bunny was referenced in season 11, episode 12 of the television show Cheers. Carla Tortelli states that she's read the book to her 8 kids over a thousand times and it 'made her bawl each time.' It is also referenced in the Pulitzer Prize-winning plays Wit and Rabbit Hole as well as the film adaption of Wit.

The Runaway Bunny was also referenced in Korean drama, Mother. A musical adaptation of The Runaway Bunny, by Paul Lewis (book, music, lyrics) and Gabriel Carbajal (book) had its world premiere at Boston Children's Theatre in February 2019.

References

Citations

Sources 
 Pearson, Claudia. Have a Carrot: Oedipal Theory and Symbolism in Margaret Wise Brown's Runaway Bunny Trilogy Birmingham, AL: Look Again Press 2010.  https://www.smashwords.com/books/view/21324
 Marcus, Leonard. Margaret Wise Brown, Awakened by the Moon Boston: Beacon Press. 1992.
 Nordstrom, Ursula.  Dear Genius: The Letters of Ursula Nordstrom  ed. Leonard S. Marcus. New York: HarperCollins, 1998.

1942 children's books
American children's books
American picture books
Books about rabbits and hares
Books by Margaret Wise Brown
Harper & Brothers books